The Brunel Museum is a small museum situated at the Brunel Engine House, Rotherhithe, London Borough of Southwark. The Engine House was designed by Sir Marc Isambard Brunel as part of the infrastructure of the Thames Tunnel which opened in 1843 and was the first tunnel to be built under a navigable river anywhere in the world. It comprises the Engine House and the Tunnel Shaft, with rooftop garden. Isambard Kingdom Brunel worked with his father on the project from 1823 and was appointed Resident Engineer in January 1827 at the age of 20.

Tunnel Shaft / Grand Entrance Hall
The museum site includes the Tunnel Shaft which was the world's first caisson. A tower of brick 3 ft thick and 50 ft in diameter was built above ground to a height of 42 ft. It was then sunk under its own weight to a depth of 40 feet. The remaining 20 ft of shaft necessary to achieve the correct level for digging the tunnel was constructed by under-pinning. The tunnelling was done by miners standing within an iron shield (or ambulating cofferdam) designed and patented by Marc Isambard Brunel. The shaft was extensively refurbished in 2016, with a staircase added to improve access.

Brunel Engine House

The Engine House was designed by Sir Marc Isambard Brunel to be part of the infrastructure of the Thames Tunnel. It held steam-powered pumps used to extract water from the tunnel.

The museum houses a model of the tunnelling shield as well as images and artefacts from when the tunnel was in use as a pedestrian thoroughfare between Rotherhithe and Wapping. 

Since 1961 the building has been used as a museum, displaying information on the construction of the tunnel and the other projects by Marc and Isambard Kingdom Brunel. Structural decay was prevented in 1975 by a charitable trust named "Brunel Exhibition Rotherhithe". 

In 2006 the museum changed its name from Brunel Engine House to Brunel Museum and expanded its exhibition to include a new mural on the shaft showing the tunnel shield, and other works by the Brunels, such as models of famous Brunel bridges incorporated into bench seating.

In 2018, the museum raised more than £200,000, including a major grant from the National Heritage Memorial Fund, to buy an album including a collection of drawings of the Thames Tunnel, prepared or overseen by Marc Isambard Brunel (1769 –1849).

Open House Weekend 
The Brunel Museum takes part in the Open House Weekend event every year and, until the East London Line's temporary closure in 2007, took parties of people through the tunnel on the Underground trains as part of a guided tour of the tunnel.

They also host a variety of other events through the year, especially during school holidays. There are also walks/tours in person and online.

Refurbishment 
The museum underwent major building works in 2007. This entailed relocating the Rennie flat V steam engine to the Chatham Historic Dockyard to create a larger exhibition space, a cafe and improved toilet facilities. With the closure of the East London Line in December 2007 for extensive upgrading, the museum hoped that the access shaft into the tunnel (originally built to be the grand entrance hall to the tunnel) could be capped with a concrete shelf at the bottom, above the level of the trains. This shelf was completed in early 2010, with the inauguration taking place in late January. The access shaft took in its first groups from the general public on 14 February 2010 (Valentine's Day) when it was opened as the 'Tunnel of Love' for short historical presentations detailing the history of the tunnel and historical notes from the private life and diary of Brunel's son, Isambard. The shaft now houses exhibition and performance space.

The Brunel Museum Reinvented project 
In 2019, the museum received development funding from the Heritage Fund and other funders to transform their offer. If the next stage of the application is successful, this project will conserve the historic building, improve visitor facilities and provide a home for the recently acquired collection of Marc Brunel's Thames Tunnel watercolour designs. They will also be able to offer a wider range of events and activities for people. As of September 2020 this project is at the community consultation stage.

References

Notes

Bibliography
The Brunels' Tunnel, Michael Palin (Foreword), Andrew Mathewson (Author), Derek Laval (Author), Julia Elton (Author), Eric Kentley (Author, Editor), The Brunel Museum (24 May 2006),

External links

 
 Photos of the Brunel Museum, archived in 2006

Infrastructure in London
Works of Isambard Kingdom Brunel
Technology museums in the United Kingdom
Museums in the London Borough of Southwark
Rotherhithe
Engine houses